The voiceless labial–velar fricative is a type of consonantal sound, used in spoken languages.

Some linguists posit voiceless approximants distinct from voiceless fricatives. To them, English  is an approximant , a labialized glottal fricative , or an  sequence, not a velar fricative. Ladefoged and Maddieson were unable to confirm that any language has fricatives produced at two places of articulation, like labial and velar. They conclude that "if it is a fricative, it is better described as a voiceless labialized velar fricative".

Features
Features of the voiceless labial–velar fricative:

Occurrence

See also
Index of phonetics articles
hwair
Wh (digraph)
Wine–whine merger

Notes

References

External links
 
 

Velar consonants
Labialized consonants
Co-articulated consonants
Voiceless oral consonants
Central consonants
Pulmonic consonants
Approximant-fricative consonants